Jhojan Manuel Valencia Jiménez (born 27 July 1996) is a Colombian football player who plays as midfielder for Austin FC in Major League Soccer.

Career
Valencia was part of the Deportivo Cali from 2015–2021, also spending a six-month stint on loan with Cúcuta Deportivo and two seasons with Unión Magdalena in 2018 and 2019. In 2021, Valencia helped Deportivo Cali become the 2021 Categoría Primera A season Finalización champions.

In January 2022, Valencia transferred to Austin FC. He made his Austin FC debut on 26 February 2022 against FC Cincinnati.

Career statistics

Club

Honours
Deportivo Cali
2015 Apertura
2021 Finalización

References

1996 births
Living people
Association football midfielders
Colombian footballers
Categoría Primera A players
Deportivo Cali footballers
Cúcuta Deportivo footballers
Unión Magdalena footballers
Austin FC players
Footballers from Cali
Colombian expatriate footballers
Colombian expatriate sportspeople in the United States
Expatriate soccer players in the United States
Major League Soccer players